Zhongzheng or Chungcheng is a common name for places, roads, schools or organizations in Chinese-speaking areas, though today predominantly in Taiwan. The majority of these places and things are named after Chiang Chung-cheng, the preferred given name of Chiang Kai-shek. As a result, when translating into English or other non-Chinese languages, it sometimes would be replaced by "Chiang Kai-shek" instead of simply by transliteration.

The usual official romanization of this name is either "Zhongzheng" (using the hanyu pinyin system), or "Chungcheng" (using the older Wade-Giles system). The former spelling has been standard in Taiwan since 2009 and in mainland China since 1958. Between about 2002 and 2009 in Taiwan, the variant "Jhongjheng" (using the tongyong pinyin system) was also seen. Other variations, using informal transcriptions, sometimes omit either instance of the letter "g", or use "u" and "o" interchangeably. The two syllables ("Zhong" and "zheng") may be separated  by a hyphen or space.

Origin
The majority of these places and institutions are named after Chiang Kai-shek. In imitation of the previous practice of naming important roads and institutions "Zhongshan", after one of the given names of Sun Yat-sen, a large campaign to rename roads and public institutions in honour of Chiang occurred in mainland China in the 1930s and 40s after Chiang came to power, and especially in 1945 after victory against Japan under a government led by Chiang. The campaign spread to Taiwan when it was recovered by the Republic of China government after the war. However, after the Republic of China lost control of mainland China to the Communist Party of China from the late 1940s, the vast majority of roads and institutions named "Zhongzheng" were renamed (whereas those named after Sun Yat-sen have remained largely unchanged). As a result, the vast majority of roads and institutions named "Zhongzheng" are now located in Taiwan.

In Chinese, zhongzheng simply means "upright", and there are some usages which predate Chiang Kai-shek, such as "zhongzheng" (中正), a term describing a government official of the nine-rank system in imperial China. In Japanese history, the same characters ("中正") are used in names such as the organisation "Chuuseikai" (中正会), which are also unrelated to Chiang.

Standard romanizations in Mandarin
Hanyu Pinyin: Zhongzheng
Wade-Giles: Chungcheng
MPS II: Jungjeng
Tongyong Pinyin: Jhongjheng

Usage

Administrative divisions
Zhongzheng District (中正區), Taipei
Zhongzheng District (中正區), Keelung
Taoyuan Zhongzheng Arts and Cultural Business District (桃園中正藝文特區), Taoyuan
 There are numerous "Zhongzheng Villages" (中正里) in Taiwan.

Roads
Many cities in Taiwan have one or more major streets called "Zhongzheng Road" or "Zhongzheng Street".
Many cities in mainland China previously had one or more major streets called "Zhongzheng Road":
Zhongzheng Road was a major east-west artery road of Shanghai, now renamed Yan'an Road.

Schools
National Chung Cheng University (國立中正大學) is a university in Taiwan
Chung-Cheng Armed Forces Preparatory School (中正預校) is a military cadet school in Taiwan
Chung Cheng High School (中正中學) is a high school in Singapore
There are numerous Zhongzheng or Chungcheng elementary schools, and junior and senior high schools in Taiwan (中正國小, 中正國中 and 中正高中 respectively):
 Taipei Municipal Zhong-zheng Senior High School in Taipei

Parks
 There are numerous Zhongzheng Parks in Taiwan:
 Zhongzheng Park in Keelung
 Zhongzheng Park in Jinhu Township, Kinmen County
 There were previously Zhongzheng Parks in many cities in mainland China

Aviation
 Taiwan Taoyuan International Airport was formerly known as (officially) "Chiang Kai-shek International Airport" or (directly translated) "Chung-cheng International Airport".
 Chung Cheng Aviation Museum is an aviation museum located at Taoyuan International Airport

Ships
  is the name of several ships of the Republic of China Navy

Honours and awards
 Order of Chiang Chung-Cheng is more directly translated as the "Chung-cheng Order"
 The Chung-cheng Sword was awarded by Chiang Kai-shek to graduates of the Whampoa Military Academy and as a battle honour.

See also
Romanization of Chinese in the Republic of China
Chung Shan (disambiguation)

Chinese words and phrases
Romanization of Chinese